Thomas Thornton (1885 – 1951) was an English footballer who played for Stoke.

Career
Thornton was born in Birmingham and played amateur football with Kingstanding Swifts before joining Crewe Alexandra. After an unsuccessful spell in Crewe, Baxter joined Stoke and played 20 times for the "Potters" scoring once during the 1910–11 season. He later played for Newport County.

Career statistics

References

1885 births
1951 deaths
Footballers from Birmingham, West Midlands
English footballers
Crewe Alexandra F.C. players
Stoke City F.C. players
Newport County A.F.C. players
English Football League players
Association football defenders